The 1975–76 Gillette Cup was the seventh edition of what is now the Marsh One-Day Cup, the domestic limited-overs cricket competition in Australia. It was the third season of the competition to carry that name.

Sponsored by Gillette, the competition was played using a knockout format, and featured the six state teams. The 1975–76 season was the first not to feature New Zealand, which had been invited but had to withdraw after a scheduling conflict. Queensland and Western Australia eventually progressed to the final, held at the Gabba, with Queensland winning by four runs to claim its first domestic one-day title. Queensland's captain, Greg Chappell, led the tournament in both runs and wickets.

Squads

Fixtures

First round

Semi-finals

Final

References

1975–76 Australian cricket season
1975
Domestic cricket competitions in 1975–76